Adam Cooper may refer to:
Adam Cooper (Blue Heelers), fictional character
Adam Cooper (dancer) (born 1971), actor, choreographer, dancer and theater director, formerly of the Royal Ballet
Adam Cooper (soccer) (born 1977), American soccer player and coach

See also
Adam Ashley-Cooper (born 1984), Australian rugby union player